D. R. K. Kiran is an Indian actor and art director who works primarily in Tamil Cinema. He started his career as an asst. art director during the early 1990s, and worked in films like Seeman, Kuruthipunal, Nerukku Ner, Alaipayudhey, etc. 
He started on his own as an art director by 1998, working on movies like Ooty, Kalvum Katru Mara, Vamanan, Thiru Thiru Thuru Thuru, Cynade [Kannada], Jagadam [Telugu], Mayakkam Enna, 3, Ko, Irandam Ulagam, Anegan, Podaa Podi, Aaha Kalyanam, Naanum Rowdy Dhaan, Kavan, Thaanaa Serndha Koottam and Kuppathu Raja. Has been working on TV Channels, like Vijay Television, Sun Television, Jaya Television in Tamil Nadu, Maa Television in Andhra Pradesh,
Asianet Television in Kerala, Asianet Television and Zee Television in Kannada. He has an experienced background of over 2000 TV commercials in international, national and local brands. Apart from these, he has also been doing interior designs and event designing. In addition to art direction, he has also acted in movies as a villain and in supporting roles.

Filmography
Actor

Art Director

References

Male actors from Chennai
1974 births
Living people
Male actors in Tamil cinema
Indian male film actors
Indian art directors